Eric Gorfain is an American violinist and founder of The Section Quartet, a string quartet that plays cover versions of rock songs. He is married to singer-songwriter Sam Phillips, with whom he has toured and recorded.

Gorfain studied music at UCLA and won a scholarship to spend a semester at the Sakuyo Junior College of Music in Japan. He worked as a studio violinist and became fluent in Japanese. Beginning in 1991, he toured and recorded with musicians in Japan, then returned to Los Angeles three years later. In 1995, he was hired to work on the reunion tour of Robert Plant and Jimmy Page of Led Zeppelin. He followed the tour to Japan where his knowledge of Japanese allowed him to act as translator.

The Section Quartet
Soon after the Robert Plant and Jimmy Page tour, he formed the Section Quartet, which calls itself "a rock band with strings". Gorfain said the quartet was inspired by his time with Plant and Page and by an ambition to play lead guitar in a rock band. He wrote an arrangement for the song "Dazed and Confused" by Led Zeppelin and recorded it on the album No Electricity Required (2004). The album includes cover versions of songs by the rock bands Coldplay, Kiss, Iron Maiden, and Queens of the Stone Age.

The quartet's members are violinists Eric Gorfain and Daphne Chen, cellist Richard Dodd, and violist Leah Katz. They are classical musicians who also work on soundtracks and pop music albums, such as Stripped (RCA, 2002) by Christina Aguilera. The quartet's performance on the song "Beautiful" from Aguilera's album caught the attention of the songwriter, Linda Perry, and she produced their album Fuzzbox (2007) for Decca Records.

Gorfain has written string arrangements for  Sam Phillips, Ryan Adams, A Perfect Circle, Band of Horses, Neil Diamond, Sean Lennon, and Cassandra Wilson, and has worked as an arranger and orchestrator with producers Jon Brion, Glyn Johns, and Jacknife Lee.

Discography
With The Section Quartet
 2004 No Electricity Required
 2006 Lizard Like Us
 2007 Fuzzboxx

With Ryan Adams
 2007 Easy Tiger  
 2011 Ashes & Fire 
 2015 1989

With Christina Aguilera
 2002 Stripped
 2006 Back to Basics

With Neil Diamond
 2014 Melody Road
 2016 Acoustic Christmas

With Grant-Lee Phillips
 2004 Virginia Creeper
 2006 Nineteeneighties
 2007 Strangelet
 2009 Little Moon
 2016 The Narrows

With Sam Phillips
 1994 Martinis & Bikinis
 2004 A Boot and a Shoe
 2008 Don't Do Anything
 2011 Solid State
 2013 Push Any Button

With Spock's Beard
 2005 Octane
 2006 Spock's Beard
 2010 X

With Al Stewart
 2005 A Beach Full of Shells
 2008 Sparks of Ancient Light

With others
 2004 Seventy Two & Sunny, Uncle Kracker
 2005 Back to Bedlam, James Blunt
 2005 The Day After Yesterday, Rick Springfield
 2006 Friendly Fire, Sean Lennon
 2007 Civilians, Joe Henry
 2007 Indiana, Jon McLaughlin
 2009 Here We Go Again, Demi Lovato
 2009 Fashionably Late, Honor Society
 2010 Something for the Rest of Us, Goo Goo Dolls
 2010 Belle and Sebastian Write About Love, Belle and Sebastian
 2011 Sophisticated Ladies, Charlie Haden
 2012 After Hours, Glenn Frey
 2012 Red, Taylor Swift
 2014 You Should Be So Lucky, Benmont Tench
 2016 This Girl's in Love, Rumer
 2016 Post Pop Depression, Iggy Pop
 2016 The Altar, Banks
 2017 Salutations, Conor Oberst
 2017 The Far Field, Future Islands
 2023 Mercy, John Cale

References

Living people
American male violinists
21st-century American violinists
21st-century American male musicians
Year of birth missing (living people)